The American Manufacturing Council was a group of prominent chief executives set up to advise U.S. President Donald Trump on domestic manufacturing initiatives. It was chaired by Andrew Liveris, CEO of Dow Chemical Company. 

Following the withdrawal of several members after Trump's defense of alt-right protestors at the Unite the Right Rally, Trump on August 16, 2017 disbanded the Council, as well as the Strategic and Policy Forum. The council itself had earlier informed the president that they intended to disband on their own initiative.

Members

Resignations and disbandment

Paris Agreement 
In June 2017, Elon Musk announced his resignation from the council. He stated departure from the council was a direct response to the United States' withdrawal from the Paris Agreement.

Unite the Right Rally In Charlottesville, Virginia 
Seven executives resigned from the council in response to Trump's response to the violence at the Unite the Right rally in Charlottesville, Virginia on August 12, 2017. The first executives to resign were drugmaker Merck & Co. CEO Kenneth Frazier, Under Armour CEO Kevin Plank, and Intel CEO Brian Krzanich. On August 15, 2017, Scott Paul, president of the Alliance for American Manufacturing, also resigned. The same day, Richard Trumka and Thea Lee resigned, stating that "We cannot sit on a council for a President who tolerates bigotry and domestic terrorism."

Disbandment
Following the withdrawal of the members, Stephen A. Schwarzman and the remaining members decided to disband the Council during a conference call on August 16, 2017. Schwarzman called Trump the same day to announce that they had decided to disband the Council. Trump tweeted shortly after that saying that he and the group had agreed to disband the Council, as well as the Strategic and Policy Forum.

See also
 President's Council on Jobs and Competitiveness (2011–2013) – an earlier similar board
 Strategic and Policy Forum (January–August 2017) – another board also disbanded

References

Trump administration controversies
American advisory organizations
2017 establishments in Washington, D.C.
2017 disestablishments in Washington, D.C.
Defunct organizations based in Washington, D.C.